The Folks That Live on the Hill is Kingsley Amis's 20th novel, first published in 1990.

The novel's protagonist is Harry Caldecote, a retired librarian living in a fictional 'Shepherd's Hill' area of North London, suggested in fact to be Primrose Hill. Harry is twice divorced and lives with his sister Clare.  The novel describes the interaction of Harry's extended family of son Piers, brother Freddie, sister-in-law Desiree and Fiona and Bunty who are relatives of his former wives. The narration takes place in turn, from the viewpoint of the principal characters of the novel. In this work, Amis lampoons the attitudes and lifestyles of the North London chattering classes.

Reception 
This work was compared favourably with Amis' Booker Prize-winning novel The Old Devils.  This late 20th century 'comedy of manners' was described as 'cheerful and gregarious as a crowded saloon bar'. It was also described as 'a pleasant, rambling, sometimes touching tale'.

References

1990 British novels
Novels by Kingsley Amis
Hutchinson (publisher) books